Uspenye is a rural locality (a selo) in Tolshmenskoye Rural Settlement, Totemsky  District, Vologda Oblast, Russia. The population was 310 as of 2002. There are 4 streets.

Geography 
Uspenye is located 94 km south of Totma (the district's administrative centre) by road. Golebatovo is the nearest rural locality.

References 

Rural localities in Tarnogsky District